Parnara guttata, the common straight swift, is a butterfly of the family Hesperiidae. It is found in the Indomalayan realm, Amur (Russian Far East), eastern China, and Japan.

Its wingspan is about 40 mm. 

 
Common straight swift larvae feed on various grasses, including rice.

References

Hesperiinae
Butterflies of Indochina
Articles containing video clips